Doug Barfield (born March 14, 1936) is a former American football player and coach.  Barfield was the head football coach at Auburn University from 1976 to 1980 where he compiled an on-field record of 27–27–1 during his five-year tenure. Auburn was subsequently awarded two victories due to forfeits by Mississippi State in 1976 and 1977, thus improving Barfield's record to 29–25–1.  Barfield lost all five games as head coach at Auburn against in-state rival, Alabama.

A native of Grove Hill, Alabama, Barfield played college football at The University of Southern Mississippi.  Prior to becoming the head football coach at Auburn, he served as an assistant for several college football teams, including a stint as the offensive coordinator at Auburn from 1974 to 1975.  After his dismissal as head coach at Auburn following the 1980 season, Barfield served as the head coach at several high schools in Alabama.

Head coaching record

References

1936 births
Living people
Auburn Tigers football coaches
Clemson Tigers football coaches
Mississippi State Bulldogs football coaches
Southern Miss Golden Eagles football coaches
Southern Miss Golden Eagles football players
High school football coaches in Alabama
People from Grove Hill, Alabama